Sohrab Khan Gorji, also known by his nickname 'Naqdi, was a courtier in 19th-century Qajar Iran of Georgian origin.

Biography
Sohrab Khan had fought in the Russo-Iranian Wars, and held several titles and positions, amongst which Gholam-e Pishkhedmat-bashi (chief of the attendant pages) and tahvildar (cash keeper). He was tasked with managing the pocket money of king Nāser-ad'din Shah Qajar (r. 1848-1896); thus, he received the nickname 'Naqdi ("the pecuniary"). He was later appointed as a chief customs officer, and was also involved in buying land in relation to the vaqf system.

Sohrab Khan was married to the thirty-ninth daughter of king Fath-Ali Shah Qajar (r. 1797-1834). He had at least three sons; Vali Khan (also known as Eregli Khan or Irikli Khan), Mohammad-Ali Khan (2nd son), and Hoseyn Khan.

Sources
 
 

19th-century deaths
Iranian people of Georgian descent
People of the Russo-Persian Wars
Qajar courtiers
Qajar civil servants
Shia Muslims from Georgia (country)